Paradise (later renamed Guns of Paradise) is an American Western family television series, broadcast by CBS from October 27, 1988, to May 10, 1991. Created by David Jacobs and Robert Porter, the series presents the adventures of fictitious gunfighter Ethan Allen Cord, whose sister left her four children in his custody when she died.

Synopsis
Paradise, set from 1890 and on, starred Lee Horsley as Cord, a professional gunfighter who was forced to take custody of the four children of his sister Lucy (Kathryn Leigh Scott), a St. Louis singer who was dying and unable to make any other arrangements for their care. Cord realized his profession was unsuitable to child rearing and decided to change, renting a farm from Amelia Lawson (Sigrid Thornton), who also owned the local bank in the small town of Paradise, California (the origin of the title). Ethan tried to live a peaceful life, but was constantly haunted by his violent past and frequently called upon by the townspeople to defend them from lawlessness. Cord was close friends with John Taylor (Dehl Berti), a Native American medicine man, who often provided him with wise counsel and insights into human nature.

Cast

Main cast
 Lee Horsley as Ethan Allen Cord
 Jenny Beck as Claire Carroll
 Matthew Newmark as Joseph Carroll
 Brian Lando as Benjamin Carroll
 Michael Patrick Carter as George Carroll
 Sigrid Thornton as Amelia Lawson
 Dehl Berti as John Taylor
 John F. Bloom III as Tiny

Guest cast
In a two-part episode, Gene Barry and Hugh O'Brian recreated their famous 1950s television roles of legendary gunslingers Bat Masterson and Wyatt Earp. The special two-part episode briefly launched the ratings-challenged series into the top 10 of the Nielsen Ratings. Robert Harland, who co-starred in the 1960 television western Law of the Plainsman, made his last television appearance in 1988 on Paradise.

Episodes

Production

Development
After the second season ended the show went on hiatus to make some changes. It returned to the air in January 1991 for its shortened and final third season. A new opening sequence introduced the series' new name, Guns of Paradise, an apparent attempt to remind viewers that the program, despite its title, was in fact a Western. Cord and Amelia were now engaged and in the process of building a new house; and Cord was in the process of achieving an official appointment to be the town's marshal, the role he had essentially been fulfilling unofficially.

In 1991, despite a loyal fan base and critical acclaim, the series was canceled after three seasons amid low viewer ratings. In the mid-'90s, The Family Channel ran Paradise in syndication.

Home media
On April 25, 2017, Warner Bros. released the first season of Paradise on DVD.

Awards and nominations

References

 Brooks, Tim and Marsh, Earle, The Complete Directory to Prime Time Network and Cable TV Shows, p. 1050

External links
 
 

1980s American drama television series
1990s American drama television series
1988 American television series debuts
1991 American television series endings
CBS original programming
English-language television shows
Serial drama television series
Television series by Lorimar Television
1980s Western (genre) television series
Period family drama television series
Television shows set in California
Television series set in the 1890s
1990s Western (genre) television series
Television series created by David Jacobs (writer)